Wormian bone-multiple fractures-dentinogenesis imperfecta-skeletal dysplasia syndrome is a rare genetic bone disorder which is characterized by the presence of wormian bones in the skull, dentinogenesis imperfecta, recurrent bone fractures, hypertelorism, and eye puffiness. This disorder is unique from osteogenesis imperfecta because of the presence of cortical defects and the absence of defective collagen or osteopenia. It is not exactly known whether this condition is autosomal dominant or autosomal recessive.

It has been described in 2 non-consanguineous families.

References 

Osteopathies
Rare genetic syndromes